Anna Chalon (born 30 October 1989), also known under the stage name Kiddo, is a French singer-songwriter, guitarist, and performer. She wrote and performed the song Run and Hide for the film Je l'aimais (Somebody I Loved), based on the book by Anna Gavalda. She composes and performs the title Hush Hush played during the end credits of No et moi based on the novel of Delphine de Vigan. She is the daughter of Zabou Breitman and sister of Antonin Chalon.

Biography 
After obtaining her law degree from the Panthéon-Assas University, Anna Chalon studied music. She is a graduate of the London Music School and the Berklee College of Music in Boston, known as the most prestigious school of modern music in the world.

In 2009, her song Run and Hide was nominated for the World Soundtrack Awards in the category of Best Original Song written specifically for film. The song was up against those by established artists such as Jamie Cullum, Kyle Eastwood, Bruce Springsteen and Allah Rakha Rahman.

The release of her first studio album was in 2012. This was done in collaboration with Jay Newland, who has worked on the first album of Norah Jones, Come Away with Me.

Filmography 
 2001: Se souvenir des belles choses by Zabou Breitman
 2006: L'Homme de sa vie by Zabou Breitman
 2009: Je l'aimais by Zabou Breitman
 2010: No et moi by Zabou Breitman

References

External links

1989 births
Living people
Musicians from Paris
French singer-songwriters
French people of Russian-Jewish descent
French women guitarists
Berklee College of Music alumni
21st-century French singers
21st-century French women singers
21st-century guitarists
21st-century women guitarists